The 2014 Memphis Tigers football team represented the University of Memphis in the 2014 NCAA Division I FBS football season. The Tigers were coached by third-year head coach Justin Fuente and played their home games at the Liberty Bowl Memorial Stadium in Memphis, Tennessee. The Tigers competed as a member of the American Athletic Conference. Memphis began the year with low expectations since they finished at the bottom of the American Athletic Conference and posted a 3–9 (1–7 The American) record in 2013. However, the Tigers turned completely around. First, they finished in a three-way tie with Cincinnati and UCF for the conference title by posting a 10–3 (7–1 The American) record. It was their first conference championship (shared) since 1971 when Memphis was part of the Missouri Valley Conference. The 2014 10-win season equaled the total number of wins Memphis posted over the 2010–2013 seasons. Also, the 10-win season was the first time Memphis had posted double digit wins in a season since 1938. The Tigers also won their first bowl game since 2005 by beating BYU 55–48 in double OT in the inaugural Miami Beach Bowl. Memphis also finished #25 in the final AP Poll for the first time since 2004.

Schedule

Rankings

Game summaries

Austin Peay

UCLA

Middle Tennessee

Ole Miss

Cincinnati

Houston

SMU

Tulsa

Temple

Tulane

South Florida

UConn

BYU (Miami Beach Bowl)

Depth chart

References

Memphis
Memphis Tigers football seasons
American Athletic Conference football champion seasons
Miami Beach Bowl champion seasons
Memphis Tigers football